The All Nations Party was a minor political party in British Columbia, Canada. Its primary base of support was the First Nations aboriginal peoples of Canada.

In the 2001 provincial election, the All Nations Party nominated six First Nations candidates for office. The party received 3,380 votes, 3.94% of the total votes in the ridings in which the candidates ran. The party's greatest electoral success came in North Coast riding, where 40% of the population is aboriginal. In this region, the All Nations Party received 4.84% of the vote, the second-largest share of votes cast. In Yale-Lillooet, party leader Don Moses won 1,126 votes for 6.87% of the total, placing fourth out of six candidates in the riding.

In 2004, the All Nations Party became involved in efforts to create a new centrist coalition. On January 16, 2005, the party was absorbed into the Democratic Reform British Columbia party.

See also
 List of Canadian political parties

References
Elections BC

Defunct political parties in Canada
Indigenist political parties in North America